Edward Tennyson Reed (1860–1933) was an English political cartoonist and illustrator, primarily known for his cartoons in Punch Magazine.

Biography
Edward Tennyson Reed was born in Greenwich, London, on 27 March 1860, the son of Chief Naval Architect and MP for Cardiff Sir Edward James Reed and his wife Rossetta. Reed was educated at Harrow School and later studied for the Bar. However he preferred the world of art, and trained at Calderon's Art School before attempting to make a living as a portrait painter. After little success in this area he moved into caricatures. He began drawing for Punch in 1889 and remained a contributor until his death. In 1893 Punch first published one of his most popular cartoon series, Prehistoric Peeps, which was turned into a silent animated film in 1905. E.T. Reed succeeded Harry Furniss as political caricaturist of Punch in 1893. His satirical portraits illustrated the 'Essence of Parliament' articles for the next eighteen years. 1909 saw the publication of Panko or Votes for Women, a game about the women's suffrage movement with cards designed by Reed.   He exhibited work at the Society of Graphic Art's first annual exhibition in 1921. Reed died in London on 12 July 1933 after a long illness. He was married in Wandsworth, London, in 1891 to Beatrice Bullen; they had a daughter and a son.

Bibliography

References

External links
 

1860 births
1933 deaths
People educated at Harrow School
British cartoonists
Punch (magazine) cartoonists
British editorial cartoonists